The Moroccan ambassador in Riyadh is the official representative of the Government in Rabat to the Government of Saudi Arabia.

List of representatives

References 

 
Saudi Arabia
Morocco